The Minor Sod House, also known as Minor Post Office, near McDonald, Kansas, is a sod house that was built c. 1907.  

The exterior is cement and stucco in the two sections.

It was used as the first post office of Minor, Kansas, with first postmaster Tom Minor.  A grocery store built by Minor not far away then served as the post office, then it returned to the soddy when the grocery store closed, until the post office itself closed in November 1920.

It was listed on the U.S. National Register of Historic Places in 2005.  It served historically as a single dwelling and as a post office.

References

Houses on the National Register of Historic Places in Kansas
Houses completed in 1907
Houses in Rawlins County, Kansas
Sod houses
National Register of Historic Places in Rawlins County, Kansas